Working from Within may refer to:

 Working from Within: Chicana and Chicano Activist Educators in Whitestream Schools, 2009 book
 Working from Within: The Nature and Development of Quine's Naturalism, 2018 book